Tarumaezan Shrine (樽前山神社, Tarumaezan Jinja) is a Shinto shrine in Tomakomai, Iburi Subprefecture, Hokkaidō, Japan. It is located on Mount Tarumae, and it was promoted to a prefectural shrine in 1936. It enshrines the Shinto kami Kukunochi (久久能智神), Kaya no hime (鹿屋野比賣神), and Oyamatsumi (大山津見神).

See also
 List of Shinto shrines in Hokkaidō

External links
Official website

Shinto shrines in Hokkaido
Beppyo shrines